In optics, optical path length (OPL, denoted Λ in equations), also known as optical length or optical distance, is the length that light needs to travel through air to create the same phase difference as it would have when traveling through some homogeneous medium. It is calculated by taking the product of the geometric length of the optical path followed by light and the refractive index of the homogeneous medium through which the light ray propagates; for inhomogeneous optical media, the product above is generalized as a path integral as part of the ray tracing procedure. A difference in OPL between two paths is often called the optical path difference (OPD). OPL and OPD are important because they determine the phase of the light and governs interference and diffraction of light as it propagates.

Formulation

In a medium of constant refractive index, n, the OPL for a path of geometrical length s is just

If the refractive index varies along the path, the OPL is given by a line integral

where n is the local refractive index as a function of distance along the path C.

An electromagnetic wave propagating along a path C has the phase shift over C as if it was propagating a path in a vacuum, length of which, is equal to the optical path length of C.  Thus, if a wave is traveling through several different media, then the optical path length of each medium can be added to find the total optical path length.  The optical path difference between the paths taken by two identical waves can then be used to find the phase change.  Finally, using the phase change, the interference between the two waves can be calculated.

Fermat's principle states that the path light takes between two points is the path that has the minimum optical path length.

Optical path difference

The OPD corresponds to the phase shift undergone by the light emitted from two previously coherent sources when passed through mediums of different refractive indices. For example, a wave passing through air appears to travel a shorter distance than an identical wave in glass. This is because the source in the glass experiences a smaller number of wavelengths due to the higher refractive index of the glass.

The OPD can be calculated from the following equation:

where d1 and d2 are the distances of the ray passing through medium 1 or 2, n1 is the greater refractive index (e.g., glass) and n2 is the smaller refractive index (e.g., air).

See also
Air mass (astronomy)
Lagrangian optics
Hamiltonian optics
Fermat's principle
Optical depth

References

Geometrical optics
Physical optics